Milcorus or Milkoros was a town of the Chalcidice in ancient Macedonia. It belonged to the Delian League since it appears in the tribute records of Athens between 435/4 and 433/2 BCE. It is probable that it was one of the cities that rebelled against Athens in 432 BCE.

Its site is unlocated.

References

Populated places in ancient Macedonia
Former populated places in Greece
Geography of ancient Chalcidice
Members of the Delian League
Lost ancient cities and towns